Flashes is a science fiction film by Amir Valinia. It stars Tom Sizemore, Christopher Judge, Donny Boaz, Elle LaMont, Anthony Omari, AnnMarie Giaquinto, Deke Anderson and Johnny Walter. A man has his perception of reality challenged as he goes through a series of realities.

Story
The story is about a man who is happy with a contented life. Then things change that challenge his perception of reality. He ends up in three parallel lives. He just wants it to stop so he can get back to normality. In the three different realities the man goes through, he is an architect in one of them, a rock singer in another and in the third he is a killer.<ref>Voyage Housston;;, July 11, 2018 - Meet Amir Valinia of AV1 Productions in Downtown</ref> In order to find out what
's going on, he seeks the help of his psychologist who believes the problem may be because he is not taking his prescribed medication.AdoroCinema - Flashes It is also a complex love story with many sub-plots within.

Background
The film is directed by Amir Valinia and the story was written by Andrew M. Henderson.
In July, 2013, the film makers were looking for actors to fill the roles for the film.
The film was originally called Flashes but a re-cut version was released as Alternate Realities''. The film started out as a short but ended up becoming a feature-length film. The film was dedicated to Erika Cardenas who was the girlfriend of the director. She died five weeks before the release of the film.

The sound editor supervisor was Sammy Huen, and the music resulted in an award for Best Sound Design at the 2014 Action on Film International Film Festival.

Cast
 Tom Sizemore as Detective Mark Hume
 Christopher Judge     
 Elle LaMont as Clare Rotit   
 Natalie Wilemon     
 Donny Boaz   
 Johnny Walter   
 Danny Kamin    
 Deke Anderson as Dr. Ryan Greene  
 Bailey Vaughn McAndrew    
 Lee Stringer 
 Lydia Martinez    
 Catherine Lawrence Kinslow    
 Paula Marcenaro Solinger    
 Dimitrius Pulido    
 Kristin Cochell   
 David DeLao   
 Bonnie Gayle    
 Erin Elizabeth Reed     
 Joe Grisaffi    
 Ann Elizabeth Arnett   
 Rod Hermansen    
 Lance Henry   
 Thada Catalon    
 Cara Cochran 
 Anthony Omari

References

External links
 Website
 Imdb: Flashes
 Rotten Tomatoes: Flashes
 Houston Press: Flashes: A New Houston-Based Film About Alternate Realities
 c47houston.com: C47Houston Flix Review: "Flashes"

American science fantasy films
American science fiction films